The Waterhouse Natural Science Art Prize, formerly the Waterhouse Natural History Art Prize, is a biennial competition for artists, with a science theme, organised by the South Australian Museum in Adelaide, South Australia.

History
The prize was established in 2002 and named after Frederick George Waterhouse, who was the first curator of the Museum. He discovered 40 new species of fish along the SA coastline, collected plants, insects, reptiles, birds and mammals and was an avid naturalist. The annual competition changed its name to "Waterhouse Natural Science Art Prize" in 2013.

The competition was not held in 2015 due to a consultative review on the nature of the competition. However, a retrospective exhibition, Magnified: 12 years of the Waterhouse Natural Science Art Prize, exhibiting all winners thus far, took place at the National Archives of Australia (NAA) in Canberra.

It was held again in 2016, and has been held biennially since then.

Description
 there are two categories of prize, which is open to artists of any age, nationality and experience:
Open Prize, worth $30,000; and
Emerging Artist Prize, worth .

There is an exhibition of the works at the museum, which also tours to the Museum of Australian Democracy in Canberra, hosted by the NAA, and all of the exhibits are available for purchase.

Winners
2022 Kyoko Hashimoto and Guy Keulemans for Bioregional Rings (Central Coast)
2022 Emerging artist category: Deb McKay, for Fragile Forms

2020 Grayson Cooke and Emma Walker for Open Air (multimedia work)
2020 Emerging artist category: Rebecca McEwan, for 4000 Stories (sculptural installation)

2018: Erica Seccombe, for Metamorphosis (video work)
2018 Emerging artist category: Hayley Lander, for The great forgetting (painting)

2016: Julia deVille for Neapolitan Bonbonaparte
2014: Carole King for High Tide, Wynnum (painting)
2013: Judith Brown for Flight of Fancy (a cape made of leaves and bulb casings)
2012: Margaret Loy Pula for Anatye (Bush Potato) (painting)
2011: Julie Blyfield for Scintilla Series-Spiralling weed, Soft sponge, Sea urchin (silver objects)
2010: Nikki Main for Flood Stones (glass art)
2009: Matilda Mitchell for Fish (painting)
2008: Michael McWilliams for Bandicoot Playground (painting)
2005: Michael McWilliams for The Centre of Attention (painting)
2004: Chris Stubbs for Forgive Them Mother (clay sculpture)
2003: James King for Winter Foliage #12

Funding 
The Waterhouse Natural Science Art Prize receives sponsorship from public and private sectors. The prize is also supported by private donations.

In 2014, Gala launch principal sponsors were Beach Energy and the Government of South Australia. Exhibition prize sponsors were legal firm Fisher Jeffries, printer Finsbury Green and the South Australian Department of Environment, Water and Natural Resources (DEWNR). Private donations in support of the prizes (a total prize pool of ) in 2014 included:

 The Helen Hill Smith OAM Prize for Sculpture and Objects, presented by Sam and Robert Hill Smith in memory of their mother;
 The Dr Wendy Wickes Memoriam Prize, provided by "her life’s companion"; and
 The Paintings Prize, presented in recognition of the Adelaide pasta company San Remo.

In 2018 the prize had federal government support through the Australia Council for the Arts and the National Archives of Australia; from the Government of South Australia via Arts South Australia; from the City of Adelaide; and from private sponsors the Hill Smith Gallery, Fisher Jeffries, The Adelaide Review, and printers Finsbury Green.

References

Awards established in 2002
Australian art awards
2002 establishments in Australia